Fighting Back may refer to:

 Fighting Back (Cloven Hoof album), 1986
 Fighting Back (Battlezone album), 1986
 Fighting Back (1948 film), directed by Malcolm St. Clair
 Fighting Back: The Rocky Bleier Story, a 1980 made-for-television movie
 Fighting Back (1982 American film)
 Fighting Back (1982 Australian film)